Timmi Hvidtfeldt Johansen (born 8 May 1987) is a Danish former professional footballer. He played eleven games for the Denmark national under-21 football team. He played youth football with Hvidovre IF, before moving to SC Heerenveen in 2006.

Career
On 5 April 2013, Johansen signed for Adeccoligaen side Stabæk, terminating his contract with the club on 20 February 2015.

On 5 March 2015, he signed for Næsby. In November 2017, it was announced that Johansen had signed with BK Marienlyst in the Danish 2nd Division.

On 8 January 2018, Johansen announced his retirement from football.

References

External links
 OB profile
 Danish national team profile
 Official Danish Superliga stats
 Voetbal international profile

1987 births
Living people
Danish men's footballers
Denmark under-21 international footballers
Denmark youth international footballers
Hvidovre IF players
SC Heerenveen players
Odense Boldklub players
Viborg FF players
Stabæk Fotball players
Danish Superliga players
Eredivisie players
Eliteserien players
Norwegian First Division players
Danish expatriate men's footballers
Expatriate footballers in the Netherlands
Expatriate footballers in Norway
Association football defenders
People from Rødovre
Danish expatriate sportspeople in the Netherlands
Danish expatriate sportspeople in Norway
Danish 2nd Division players
Næsby Boldklub players
BK Marienlyst players
Sportspeople from the Capital Region of Denmark